Jean-David Malat (born in Paris, France in 1975) is a London-based art dealer and curator and founder of the JD Malat Gallery located at 30 Davies Street, Mayfair, W1K 4NB.

Career
Jean-David Malat is an internationally recognised curator and art expert who is the founder and director of the Mayfair JD Malat Gallery. Malat has been described as “London’s hottest art dealer” in a profile piece by GQ  and " “one of the most powerful people in the art world" by The Telegraph. He has purchased art for clients such as Bono, Gordon Ramsay and Dolce & Gabbana and his curatorial projects have been reviewed and praised by publications such as GQ, Evening Standard, Metro, and BBC amongst others.

In June 2013, Malat curated The Many Faces of David Bowie show. In 2014, Malat curated the Marc Chagall exhibition and the Bernard Buffet exhibition at the Heydar Aliyev Center Baku Azerbaijan. 

In 2015, Malat started working with the hyper realistic German artist Mike Dargas, who he discovered on Instagram.

In 2018, Malat founded the JD Malat Gallery in Mayfair, which opened in June 2018.

'Isolation Mastered'

In 2020, JD Malat launched a new group exhibition titled 'Isolation Mastered', which gave aspiring artists of all ages and backgrounds an opportunity to showcase and sell their artwork in one of London's leading galleries. All profits made from the Isolation Mastered exhibition were directed to each artist. They received over 1,000 submissions and featured 25 artists in the exhibition, selecting artists who demonstrated innovative dialogue with the lockdown period. 8,000 public votes selected 5 top artists, with Marina Gonzalez winning a solo exhibition at the Gallery in 2021 and Andrew Litten and Kojo Marfo being added to the JD Malat Gallery artist roster. 

Kojo Marfo

After his appearance in Isolation Mastered, Marfo sold-out shows in London at JD Malat Gallery and in New York. 

Georgia Dymock

In 2021, Malat discovered student artist Georgia Dymock from Derby, who combines digital and analogue skills in image creation, with the artist going on to sell out shows in New York, London and Monaco.

Dave Benett - 'Great Shot, Kid'

In February 2022, Malat exhibited, ‘Great Shot, Kid’ a career retrospective of acclaimed photographer Dave Benett. This was a celebration of the photographer's work including famous paparazzi images of Claudia Schiffer, Jack Nicholson, Kate Moss, Geri Halliwell, Liz Hurley and Carla Bruni. The launch was attended by many stars including Dermot O'Leary, Daisy Lowe and Jaime Winstone.

In May 2022, JD Malat gallery showed Chinese artists Ming Ying whose dream-like abstract works sold out in London and again in New York. Ming Ming described her work as an exploration of how, ‘loneliness and desire not only affect me, a London-based foreign artist, but also has a strong impact on people of different races, cultures, and distinct social classes’.

Malat supports the Serpentine Gallery and is a patron of the Tate gallery.

New York Gallery:

In May 2022, Malat opened a new gallery in New York at High Line Nine, beneath the High Line Park in Chelsea, perhaps the “epicentre of the fine art world” in Manhattan until December 2022. This featured work by artists Kojo Marfo, Georgia Dymock, Santiago Parra and Henrik A Uldalen.

Malat represents:
 Andrew Litten
 Andy Moses
 Annett Zinsmeister
 Ayanfe Olarinde
 Conrad Jon Godly
 Darren Reid
 Ed Moses
 George Oskar 
 Georgia Dymock
 ha:ar
 Hande Sekerciler
 Hans Kotter
 Henrik A Uldalen
 Jesse Willenbring
 Katrin Fridriks
 Kojo Marfo
 Li Tianbing
 Luis Olaso
 Masayoshi Nojo
 Ming Ying
 Nina Pandolfo
 Nojo Masayoshi
 Santiago Parra
 Zumrutoglu

Malat supports the Serpentine Gallery and is a patron of the Tate gallery.

Curated projects 
 Theatre Mogador, Paris, 2007
 One Hyde Park Penthouse, appointed by Candy&Candy, London, 2010-2011
 David Mach, Opera Gallery, 2010
 Theatre Lope De Vega, Madrid, 2011
 Zoobs at the Blakes, 2011
 Street Art Show, Opera Gallery, 2011
 Brainwash Street Art Show, 2011
 Urban Masters Urban Masters pop-up gallery show, Shoreditch, 2012
 The Many Faces of David Bowie The Many Faces of David Bowie, 2013
 Ways of Seeing Joe Black, 2013
 Marc Chagall May 2014
 Bernard Buffet Heydar Aliyev Center Baku Azerbaijan, September 2014 - January 2015
 Mike Dargas  Mike Dargas Solo Exhibition, 2016
 Metanoia: Henrik Uldalen Exhibition, JD Malat Gallery, 2018
 Mirror of Darkness, Zumrutoglu, JD Malat Gallery, 2018
 Santiago Parra, JD Malat Gallery, 2018
 To See is Not to Speak, Conrad Jon Godly, JD Malat Gallery, 2019
 Grey Area, Katrin Fridriks, JD Malat Gallery, 2019
  Urban Scene, Li Tianbing, JD Malat Gallery, 2019

References

External links

Reviews on Jean David Malat's curatorial projects 
 Glass Magazine - David Mach, 2010
 Market Magazine - Street Art Show, 2011
 Concierge - Mr. Brainwash, Opera Gallery 2011
 The Telegraph - Are We Being Mr. Brainwashed?
 New style Magazine - Zoobs at Blakes, 2011
 BBC - Mr. Brainwash
 Culture and Life - Rancinan in London, Opera Gallery 2011
 The Market Magazine - Gerard Rancinan, Opera Gallery 2011
 The Independent - Blek le Rat Solo Show 2012
 LUX Magazine - Rancinan, Art Out of War 2012
 LUX Magazine - Mr Brainwash, French street artist, 2012
 Leveled Magazine - Urban Masters pop-up gallery, 2012
 Evening Standard - Urban Masters at Factory 7
 Hunger TV - Venice Biennale Must Sees, 2013 
 The Independent - Rarely Seen Marc Chagall Paintings Go On Show For First Time
 GQ Magazine - Mike Dargas The Hyperrealist Artist Discovered on Instagram

Reviews on Jean-David Malat 
 The Times
 LondonLovesBusiness 
 Gridlock Magazine
 Whitewall Magazine
 Concierge Magazine
 TNT Magazine

1975 births
French art curators
Living people